Shaʽar HaGolan (lit. Gate of the Golan) is a kibbutz situated at the foot of the Golan Heights in the Jordan Valley area of north-eastern Israel. Located less than 1 km from the border with Jordan, it falls under the jurisdiction of Emek HaYarden Regional Council.

History
Sha'ar HaGolan was founded on 21 March 1937 by members of the Hashomer Hatzair youth movement from Czechoslovakia and Poland. The founders met and were organized as a team in 1930 in Rishon LeZion and were called "Ein Hakore" until 1937, when they established the kibbutz as a tower and stockade settlement.

During the Battles of the Kinarot Valley in the 1948 Arab–Israeli War, the defenders of Sha'ar HaGolan and of neighbouring kibbutz Masada, after withstanding a first Syrian attack and further aerial bombardment and shelling, retreated due to lack of reinforcement and direction. The kibbutzim were captured and briefly held by the Syrian Army, during which time they were looted and burned down. Although the members soon returned, a stigma was attached to them, and vindication in the form of released military records only arrived in recent years.

Economy
The main source of income is a plastics engineering factory. The kibbutz also grows bananas, avocado and watermelons, and has a herd of dairy cows. Another economic sector is tourism, one of the attractions on a museum of Yarmukian culture exhibiting pre-historic Neolithic findings discovered along the banks of the Yarmuk River. Established in the 1950s, it was Israel's first museum of prehistory.

Archaeology

Excavations at Sha'ar HaGolan unearthed an 8,000-year-old village and artifacts that include the first pottery cooking pots found in the Land of Israel. This Neolithic Yarmukian village was inhabited by the people who abandoned their nomadic lifestyle in favor of permanent settlement, marking the shift from hunting and gathering to agriculture.

In July 2022, archaeologists from the Israel Antiquities Authority announced the discovery of a 8000 years-old "Mother Goddess" figurine at Sha’ar HaGolan archaeological site. Anna Eirikh-Rose, co-director of the excavation reported that the 20-centimeter long figurine covered by a bracelet with a red bottom was found broken into 2 pieces. It was sculpted in a sitting position with big hips, a unique pointed hat and what is known as ‘coffee-bean’ eyes and a big nose.

Galleries

Notable people

 Miriam Roth

References

External links
Official website
El Mul Golan
Golan Plastic Products

Kibbutzim
Kibbutz Movement
Populated places established in 1937
Jewish villages depopulated during the 1948 Arab–Israeli War
Prehistoric sites in Israel
Archaeological sites in Israel
Neolithic settlements
Populated places in Northern District (Israel)
1937 establishments in Mandatory Palestine
1948 disestablishments in Israel
Czech-Jewish culture in Israel
Hungarian-Jewish culture in Israel
Slovak-Jewish culture in Israel